Puch may refer to:

Puch, a former manufacturer of cars, motorcycles, mopeds and bicycles
Puch bei Weiz, a municipality in Styria, Austria
Puch bei Hallein, a municipality in Salzburg, Austria
Puch (Fürstenfeldbruck), a district in Fürstenfeldbruck
Puch, Razavi Khorasan, a village in Razavi Khorasan Province, Iran
Puch, South Khorasan, a village in South Khorasan Province, Iran

People with the surname Puch:
Edson Puch, a Chilean footballer
Johann Puch, a Slovenian inventor and mechanic
László Puch, a Hungarian entrepreneur and politician
Mariano Puch, an Argentine footballer
Pepo Puch, an Austrian Paralympic equestrian
Robledo Puch, an Argentine serial killer